What Happens Next? was an American thrashcore band from the San Francisco Bay Area, California. They were known for their DIY ethic, anticonsumerism and worldwide unity, as well as energetic performances.

Band members

Final line-up 
Devon Morf – Vocals
Robert Collins – Bass
Craig Billmeier – Guitar
Max Ward – Drums

Discography

Albums

Splits and compilations 
Splits

Compilation albums

Associated acts 
Conquest for Death (Morf, Collins, Billmeier)
Spazz (Ward)
Artimus Pyle (Collins)
Love Songs (Billmeier)
Your Mother (Billmeier)
Fuckface (Collins)
All You Can Eat (Morf, Billmeier)
Colbom (Morf, Billmeier)
High on Crime (Collins)
Capitalist Casualties (Ward)
Scholastic Deth (Ward)
 Boo!Hiss!Pfft! (Morf)

References

External links 
 Official WHN? Website

Hardcore punk groups from California
Musical groups from the San Francisco Bay Area